Berta Rodríguez (born 24 June 1971) is a Chilean table tennis player. She competed for Chile at the 2012 Summer Olympics.

References

Chilean female table tennis players
Table tennis players at the 1996 Summer Olympics
Table tennis players at the 2000 Summer Olympics
Table tennis players at the 2004 Summer Olympics
Table tennis players at the 2012 Summer Olympics
Olympic table tennis players of Chile
1971 births
Living people
Pan American Games bronze medalists for Chile
Pan American Games medalists in table tennis
South American Games silver medalists for Chile
South American Games bronze medalists for Chile
South American Games medalists in table tennis
Table tennis players at the 1995 Pan American Games
Table tennis players at the 1999 Pan American Games
Table tennis players at the 2003 Pan American Games
Competitors at the 2006 South American Games
Medalists at the 1995 Pan American Games
Medalists at the 1999 Pan American Games
Medalists at the 2003 Pan American Games
21st-century Chilean women